Selva is a unisex given name. People with the name include:

Selva (actor), Indian film actor
Selva (director), Indian director
Selva Almada (born 1973), Argentine writer
Selva Casal (1927–2020), Uruguayan poet
Selva Erdener, Turkish operatic soprano singer 
Selva Orejón (born 1981), Spanish cybersecurity and digital identity consultant 
Selva Rasalingam (born 1968), British actor
Selva Selvaratnam, British businessman
Selva Kumar Silvaras, also spelt Selvar Kumar Silvaras, Singaporean convicted murderer

See also
Selva (disambiguation)
 Selva (surname)

Indian masculine given names
Unisex given names
Spanish feminine given names
Turkish feminine given names